2MASS J15074769−1627386 (also abbreviated to 2MASS 1507−1627) is a brown dwarf in the constellation Libra, located about 23.9 light-years from Earth. It was discovered in 1999 by I. Neill Reid et al. It belongs to the spectral class L5; its surface temperature is 1,300 to 2,000 kelvins. As with other brown dwarfs of spectral type L, its spectrum is dominated by metal hydrides and alkali metals. Its spectrum also has a weak silicate absorption band and highly variable water absorption band, indicating a complicated clouds and haze structures.

The brown dwarf is suspected to have a substellar companion (planet) on wide orbit with period over 10 years.

References

External links
Entry at DwarfArchives.org 

Libra (constellation)
Brown dwarfs
J15074769-1627386
L-type stars
Hypothetical planetary systems